Fox is a Belgian Dutch-language pay television channel broadcast in Flanders, owned by Fox Networks Group Benelux. It was launched on 1 October 2015 and features programming from Fox and HBO.

Programming 
 11.22.63
 12 Monkeys
 1864
 Ascension
 Atlanta
 Baby Daddy
 Best of Viral Videos
 Black-ish
 Blue Eyes
 Chance
 Cheers
 Chicago P.D.
 Colony 
 CSI: S3
 CSI: Miami
 CSI: NY
 Da Vinci's Demons
 De Dingen Des Levens
 De Streken Van Wim
 Deep State
 Detective Mclean
 Empire
 Falling Skies
 Episodes
 False Flag
 Gala Miss Belgie 2017 
 Gangland Undercover
 Gilmore Girls
 Joan & Melissa: Joan Knows Best?
 Judge Judy
 Law and Order
 Legion  
 Let's go Viral 
 Mars
 Million Dollar Listing New York  
 Million Dollar Listing Los Angeles   
 Mooi en Meedogenloos 
 Nashville 
 Outcast
 Outsiders 
 Push Girls
 Rosemary's Baby
 Rules of Engagement
 Six
 Sons of Liberty
 Storage Wars Canada
 Superstore
 Talking to the Dead
 The Book of Negroes
 The Border
 The Exorcist
 The Fall
 The Flash
 The Long Road Home
 The Mindy Project
 The Real O'Neals
 Tyrant
 The Young Pope
 Ultimate Airport Dubai
 Veronique 16
 Victoria's Secret Fashion Show 2016
 Victoria's Secret Swim Special
 The Millers
 Wayward Pines
 Will & Grace

References

Television channels in Flanders
Television channels in Belgium
Television channels and stations established in 2015
2015 establishments in Belgium
Flanders